Ava is a feminine given name in English and in other languages. Its recent popularity may be linked to a number of celebrity babies of the 1990s, some of whom were ultimately named after American actress Ava Gardner (1922–1990).

Origin
The medieval name Ava is an abbreviation of a Germanic name containing the first element aw-, of uncertain meaning. Old High German (8th to 9th centuries) dithematic feminine names with this element include Avagisa, Avuldis, Awanpurc, Auwanildis.  

Saint Ava was a 9th-century princess, daughter of  Pepin II of Aquitaine. Ava was also the name of a medieval German woman poet. This name is the origin of the Norman French name of Aveline, which in turn gave rise to the English given name of Evelyn.

Āvā is also a feminine given name in the Persian language, meaning "voice, sound".

In the Russian language, Ava may be a diminutive form of either the female names Avelina, Avenira, Aventina, Avgusta/Avgustina, Aviafa, Aviya (a form of Abijah), Avreliya, Avreya, and Avrora (a form of Aurora), or the male names Avdey, Avel, Avenir, Aventin, Avgust, Avim, Avram (a form of Abram), Avrelian, and Avrely.

Modern use 

The name was popularized in the United States by socialite Ava Lowle Willing (1868–1958), who married John Jacob Astor IV,  and their daughter, socialite and heiress  Ava Alice Muriel Astor (1902–1956).

 

Ava Gardner (1922–1990)  signed a contract with MGM Studios in 1941 and gained Hollywood stardom with her performance in The Killers (1946). She became one of Hollywood's leading actresses from the 1950s to the 1970s and is the ultimate reason for the given name's continued popularity.

Recent popularity
The name is popular in the United States, where it has ranked among the top 10 most popular names given to baby girls since 2005 and among the top 200 names given to girls since 2000. 

The name has been rising in popularity in the United States since the mid-1990s, but had its most dramatic jump in popularity in 1998, when it was the 350th most popular name for baby girls, jumping 268 places up the chart from 618th place in 1997. Ava was among the five most popular names for Black newborn girls in the American state of Virginia in 2022.  One factor in its increase in popularity in English-speaking countries may have been the naming of the daughters of actress Heather Locklear and musician Richie Sambora,  in 1997, and of actors Reese Witherspoon and Ryan Phillippe in 1999.

Phillippe said in a magazine interview that he and Witherspoon named their child after actress Ava Gardner.
It was the ninth most popular name for girls in Australia and eighth in New Zealand in 2013.

Notable people
Saint Ava, ninth-century Roman Catholic saint
Ava (poet) (c.1060—1127), the first-named female writer in any genre in the German language
Ava Lowle Willing (1868—1958), American socialite
Ava Alice Muriel Astor (1902—1956), American socialite, daughter of Ava Lowle Willing and John Jacob Astor IV 
Ava Barber (born 1954) American country singer
Ava DuVernay (born 1972), American film director
Ava Gardner (1922—1990), American actress
Ava Hutchinson (born 1983), Irish long distance runner
Ava Muhammad (1951–2022) American Black Muslim preacher and pioneering minister
Ava Ohlgren (born 1988), American collegiate swimmer
Ava Max, real name Amanda Ava Koci, (born 1994), American singer
Ava Stewart (born 2005), American-born Canadian artistic gymnast
Ava Yu (born 1985), Hong Kong singer, actress and television host

References

Notes

English-language feminine given names
Feminine given names
Given names